This is a list of by-elections for the New South Wales Legislative Assembly. A by-election may be held when a member's seat becomes vacant through resignation, death or some other reasons. These are referred to as casual vacancies.

Brackets around a date (D/M/Y) indicate that the candidate was unopposed when nominations closed or that, as a result of an appeal against an election result, the sitting member was replaced by the appellant. These candidates were declared "elected unopposed" with effect from the date of the closing of nominations or appeal decision, and there was no need to hold a by-election.


No party system was discernible in the New South Wales parliament before the election of 1887 



Causes
A by-election may occur whenever there is a vacancy in the Legislative Assembly.
Vacancies can occur for reasons including:
 Death
 Voluntary resignation for any reason; historically these reasons have included:
 Retirement
 Ill-health
 Family or business commitments
 Prolonged absence from the state—this occurred most commonly in the period when travel to Europe required a long sea voyage
 Loss of cabinet position, e.g., the resignation of Reba Meagher in 2008 after she lost the position of Minister for Health
 Matters of principle, e.g., Billy Dunn resigned from the seat of Mudgee in 1911 after disagreeing with his party's land ownership legislation.
 Resignation or expulsion from a political party
 To create a vacancy for a party leader who did not have a seat. This occurred most recently in 1986 when Rockdale MLA Brian Bannon resigned to enable newly elected party leader Barrie Unsworth to transfer from the Legislative Council to the Legislative Assembly.
 Public disgrace
 As a result of an inducement from an opposing party and thus create the potential for that party to increase its representation e.g. Independent MLA Alick Kay accepted an appointment to the Metropolitan Meat Board in 1927. Under a controversial use of the Legislative Assembly (Casual Vacancies) Act, he was replaced by Labor's Arthur Tonge; this gave the government of Jack Lang a secure majority in the house.
Constitutional ineligibility to be a Member of the Legislative Assembly, including:
Election result voided or overturned on appeal—appeals were initially made to the Qualifications Committee of the Assembly but since 1928 they have been determined by the Court of Disputed Returns
Election to two seats—in which case the member was required to resign from one seat
Appointment or election to the Legislative Council This occurred most commonly prior to 1936, when members of the council were appointed for life by the governor
Election to another parliament, particularly federal parliament—members are required to resign prior to the issuing of the writs for the other parliament's election
Having or accepting a position of profit under the crown
Not being a citizen of Australia
Non-residence in New South Wales for more than 6 months prior to election
Becomes of "unsound mind"
Insolvency
Conviction for a major criminal offence or, since 2007, having faced trial on a charge of sexual abuse of a minor
Absence from the house for an entire session without leave
Expulsion from the house for infamous conduct
Ministerial appointment Until 1904, members appointed to a ministerial position were required to face a by-election. These were generally uncontested. The political instability of New South Wales in the Nineteenth century caused a very large number of these by-elections and for convenience they have not been listed unless the minister was defeated.

It is now a convention that a by-election is not held if a vacancy occurs within 3–4 months of an expected dissolution of the parliament.

Notes

References

New South Wales
By-elections
 
By-elections